Kuopio railway station is located in the Maljalahti district of the city of Kuopio in the Northern Savonia region of Finland.

Asemakatu ("Station Street"), the street on which the station is situated today, was previously named Linnankatu ("Castle Street") in the early 1900s. The name Asemakatu itself was previously used for a stretch of road situated north of the rail bridge at Maaherrankatu ("Landlord Street"). The aforementioned original railway station was located at the eastern end of this Asemakatu; today, this stretch of road is named Pohjolankatu ("North Street").

References

Railway stations in North Savo
Railway stations opened in 1889
Kuopio